Armenia was represented by five athletes at the 2012 European Athletics Championships in Helsinki.

Results

Men

Field

Women

Track

Field

References
Official website

Nations at the 2012 European Athletics Championships
2012
European Athletics Championships